Cold Hanworth medieval settlement is a deserted medieval village in Lincolnshire, England, next to the village of Cold Hanworth and about  north of Lincoln. It is a Scheduled Monument.

History
The village was recorded in the Domesday Book of 1086. It was in decline from the mid 14th century. In the 17th century parts had been enclosed for pasture, and by the 18th century it was mostly depopulated.

Earthworks
The remains of the medieval village are immediately south and east of All Saints Church (a 19th-century building on the site of a medieval church). The remains of houses and outbuildings survive as rectangular ditched enclosures along both sides of the main street.

Immediately west of the church are further traces of the medieval settlement, overlain by post-medieval remains: there are traces here of a north–south street, which was the northern route to the settlement.

See also
 List of lost settlements in the United Kingdom

References

Deserted medieval villages in Lincolnshire
Scheduled monuments in Lincolnshire